is a micro-asteroid, classified as a near-Earth object of the Aten group, approximately  in diameter. It was first observed on 26 February 2018, by astronomers of the Mount Lemmon Survey at Mount Lemmon Observatory, Arizona, five days prior to its sub-lunar close encounter with Earth at less than 0.3 lunar distance.

Orbit and classification 

 belongs to the Aten group of asteroids, which cross the orbit of Earth. Contrary to the much larger Apollos, Atens have a semi-major axis of less than 1 AU, that is, a period less than a year (Earth).

Based on an observation arc of less than 2 days, it orbits the Sun at a distance of 0.82–1.15 AU once every 12 months (358 days; semi-major axis of 0.986 AU). Its orbit has an eccentricity of 0.17 and an inclination of 5° with respect to the ecliptic. The body's observation arc begins at Mount Lemmon with its first observation.

Close encounters

2018 flyby 

The object also approached the Moon at a similar distance of  the day before. It was the 18th known asteroid to flyby Earth within 1 lunar distance (LD) since the start of 2018 and 6th closest. Five days earlier, a similar object, came within 175,000 miles (284,000 km). However, the two encounters were unrelated and neither of them represent any hazard to the Earth (also see ).

MOID and projections 

Physical characteristics 

Based on a generic magnitude-to-diameter conversion,  measures between 6 and 12 meters in diameter, for an absolute magnitude of 28.4, and an assumed albedo between 0.057 and 0.20, which represent typical values for carbonaceous and stony asteroids, respectively. As of 2018, no rotational lightcurve of this object has been obtained from photometric observations. The body's rotation period, pole and shape remain unknown.

Numbering and naming 

This minor planet has neither been numbered nor named.

References

External links 
 Near-Earth Asteroid 2018 DV1 very close encounter: an image (1 Mar 2018), The Virtual Telescope Project 2.0
 Asteroid Lightcurve Database (LCDB), query form (info )
 
 
 

Minor planet object articles (unnumbered)
Discoveries by MLS
Near-Earth objects in 2018
20180226